TruConnect, formally known as TruConnect Mobile, is an American mobile virtual network operator (MVNO) that sells mobile hotspots and smartphones, 3G/4G LTE mobile data plans and prepaid cell phone talk & text plans on T-Mobile’s network. TruConnect was the first prepaid broadband provider in the U.S. to offer a pay-as-you-go, portable Wi-Fi service plans. The only Lifeline provider (ETC) headquartered in Los Angeles, CA. TruConnect uses either Sprint or T-Mobile's network depending on location.

TruConnect was founded by Matthew Johnson and Nathan Johnson and provides wireless, residential and small business telecommunication services under the Sage Telecom, Telscape Communications and TruConnect Mobile brands.

History 

In 2006, Matthew and Nathan Johnson acquire Telscape Communications, rebranding the company as TruConnect.

On August 4, 2014, D-Link and TruConnect partnered to offer internet for mobile users.

On April 29, 2015, Mobetize and TruConnect partnered to offer prepaid card services including bill payment, global prepaid airtime, and money transfers.

On April 29, 2015, TruConnect appeared as one of the fastest-growing wireless companies in the United States according to data from the Universal Service Administrative Company.

On May 11, 2015, EY announced that Matthew Johnson, Co-CEO, and Nathan Johnson, Co-CEO and chairman, were finalists for the Entrepreneur of the Year 2015 Awards Program in the Greater Los Angeles Area.

On May 21, 2015, TruConnect introduced its Forever DataSM through its Internet On The Go brand at Walmart.

On June 18, 2015, TruConnect and OTT TV service YipTV formed a joint-marketing agreement.

In October 2015, TruConnect announced its four new prepaid wireless plan options as well as new prepaid mobile data hotspot plans.

On March 30, 2016, TruConnect announces that its Chief Legal Counsel and VP of Strategy, Robert A. Yap, has been named the corporation's new president.

In July 2016, TruConnect begins offering free International Calling with their California Lifeline Plans.

In September 2016, TruConnect Communications, Inc. announces that it has formed TruConnect Technologies, LLC, a new unit that obtained the business, operating assets, and technology of WeFi, Inc.'s network operating activities. The company will be based in Los Angeles with an R&D innovation center in Tel Aviv.

In 2016, TruConnect led a buyout of TSG Capital to acquire Telscape Communications which rebranded to TruConnect. Under their leadership, TruConnect expanded by completing an acquisition of Sage Telecom, Inc. a competitive local exchange carrier (CLEC) focused on residential and small business consumers.

In early 2017, TruConnect joins with Quality One Wireless to offer leasing options for smartphones.

In April 2017, TruConnect launched its own text and dialer app, TruText.

In August 2018, TruConnect Extends into SaaS Business, Acquires FreedomPop's Proprietary Digital ETC Platform to Power Digital Acquisition Across ETC Market.

Wireless 

TruConnect offers wireless services that include 3G and 4G smartphones and mobile hotspots, and prepaid wireless talk, text, and data plans. Their service is aimed at those who need affordable and reliable devices and internet on-the-go .

Lifeline 

Lifeline is a state and federal government program that provides free or low-cost wireless service and free government phones to low-income consumers. The program is available to consumers who can provide documentation for eligibility for government phones based on either income level or participation in public assistance programs including SNAP and Medicaid, among others.

The company is in partnership with the a federal- and state-funded Lifeline program which offers discounted cell phone service. TruConnect's Lifeline Program (Universal Service Fund) provides reduced-cost or free cell phone services to eligible households in Arizona, Arkansas, California, Colorado, Georgia, Illinois, Indiana, Iowa, Kansas, Kentucky, Louisiana, Maryland, Michigan, Minnesota, Missouri, Nevada, Ohio, Oklahoma, Pennsylvania, Puerto Rico, South Carolina, Texas, Utah, Washington, West Virginia, and Wisconsin. As of May 2016, the company had 195,751 Lifeline subscribers. Total nationwide Lifeline subscribers reached 275,762 in March 2019.

As of May 2019, TruConnect's Lifeline Program has expanded to include 26 U.S. states and territories and 6 retail locations across Southern and Central California.

Competition
 Access Wireless
 Assurance Wireless
Easy Wireless
Life Wireless
QLink Wireless
 SafeLink
StandUP Wireless
TAG Mobile
 Your Call Wireless

References

External links
 

Telecommunications companies of the United States
Technology companies based in Greater Los Angeles
Companies based in Los Angeles
Mobile virtual network operators
Telecommunications companies established in 2011
2011 establishments in California